is an autobahn in western Germany. It connects Kamp-Lintfort with Castrop-Rauxel, linking several large cities in the Ruhr area, such as Dortmund, Duisburg, the North of Essen and Gelsenkirchen. It is colloquially known as Emscherschnellweg, after the river Emscher, which it roughly follows. Construction went underway in the 1970s and 1980s.

Exit list 

 

 
 

 

 

 

|}

External links 

42
A042